Creative Campaigning is an accessory for the 2nd edition of the Advanced Dungeons & Dragons fantasy role-playing game, published in 1993.

Contents

Creative Campaigning is aimed at providing Dungeon Masters with fresh ideas for running their Dungeons & Dragons campaigns.

It includes chapters outlining novel campaign settings, adventure ideas and new ways of using existing game materials.

Publication history
The accessory is published by TSR. The authors are Tony Pryor, Tony Herring, Jonathan Tweet, and Norm Ritchie.

Reception
Keith H. Eisenbeis reviewed the accessory in issue No. 38 of White Wolf magazine. He stated that "The idea behind this handbook has considerable merit, but the end result is lacking. ... While the product is well-intentioned, the information presented is so general, broad, or obvious as to render the book superfluous." Eisenbeis rated the accessory an overall 2 out of a possible 5.

References

Dungeons & Dragons sourcebooks
Role-playing game supplements introduced in 1993